Del Howison (born June 3, 1953) is an American horror author, editor and actor.

Life and career
Howison was born in Detroit, Michigan but moved to Los Angeles to pursue a career in acting; with his distinctive long white hair, he was a natural for low-budget horror films, and has since played the character "Renfield" on four separate occasions (making him the actor who has portrayed this iconic character from Dracula more than any other).

In 1995, Howison and wife Sue Duncan started Dark Delicacies, a store devoted entirely to horror books, films and gifts.

Dark Delicacies, located in Burbank, California, is dedicated solely to horror. The store has also published a number of charity anthologies, including The Altruistic Alphabet and Conjuring Dark Delicacies (a horror-themed cookbook).

In 2005, Howison and co-editor Jeff Gelb published Dark Delicacies: Original Tales of Terror and the Macabre (Carroll and Graf), which included stories by Ray Bradbury, Clive Barker, F. Paul Wilson, Chelsea Quinn Yarbro, David J. Schow, Steve Niles, Roberta Lannes, Gahan Wilson, and more. The book went on to win the 2005 Bram Stoker Award for Best Anthology.

In January 2019, when Dark Delicacies was forced to relocate, film director Guillermo del Toro backed a fundraising campaign to save the bookstore.

In 2007, Howison and co-editor Jeff Gelb published Dark Delicacies II: Fear (Carroll and Graf). In 2008 it was nominated for a Bram Stoker Award and a Shirley Jackson Award for Best Anthology.

Howison also co-edited The Book of Lists: Horror with Amy Wallace and Scott Bradley which was released in September 2008 by HarperCollins.

Howison has also written a number of non-fiction horror articles and interviews for such publications as Gauntlet and Rue Morgue magazine.

In 2008 his short story The Lost Herd (originally published in the erotic horror anthology Hot Blood 12: Strange Bedfellows 2004) was purchased for the television series Fear Itself. It was scripted by Mick Garris and the title changed to Red Snow. The title was once again changed to The Sacrifice and it was directed by Breck Eisner. The episode became the series premiere episode airing on June 5, 2008. His short story The Necrosis Factor was chosen for the anthology Traps which was released in December 2008.

In 2010 he co-authored the book Vampires Don't Sleep Alone with Elizabeth Barrial under the pseudonym of D. H. Altair. That year he also released the book When Werewolves Attack under his own name. Both books were published by Ulysses Press.

In 2019 he wrote the hardback western novel "The Survival of Margaret Thomas" which was released by Five Star Books and was a finalist for the Peacemaker Award for Best First Western Novel by the Western Fictioneers.

In 2023 "Margaret Thomas" was rereleased in trade paperback by Pandi Press

Filmography
Big Freaking Rat(2020)
Death House (2017) 
Evil Bong 420(2015)
No Solicitors(2015)
Bring Me the Head of Lance Henriksen(2010)
Dahmer Vs. Gacy (2009)
Ghost Hoax (2008)
Blood Scarab (2008)
Horrorween (2008)
Her Morbid Desires (2007)
The Naked Monster (2005)
Countess Dracula's Orgy of Blood (2004)
The Devil's Due at Midnight (2004)
Boogie with the Undead (2003)
Scarlet Countess (aka The Erotic Rites of Countess Dracula) (2001)
Horrorvision (2001)
The Vampire Hunters Club (2001)
Blood Slaves of the Vampire Wolf (1996)
Limp Fangs (1996)
Lord of Illusions (1995)

See also
List of horror fiction authors

References

External links
Dark Delicacies

1953 births
Living people
Male actors from Michigan
American male film actors
American horror writers
American short story writers
American male short story writers